Persatuan Sepakbola Indonesia Pontianak, commonly known as Persipon Pontianak, or Persipon, is an Indonesian football club based in Pontianak, West Kalimantan. They play in Liga 3.

References

External links 
 Persipon Pontianak
 

Football clubs in Indonesia
Football clubs in West Kalimantan
Association football clubs established in 1970
1970 establishments in Indonesia